Sanusi (2 February 1933 – 1 June 2018) was an Indonesian cyclist. He competed in the individual road race and team time trial events at the 1960 Summer Olympics.

References

External links
 

1933 births
2018 deaths
Indonesian male cyclists
Olympic cyclists of Indonesia
Cyclists at the 1960 Summer Olympics
Sportspeople from Medan